Below the Border is a 1942 American Western film directed by Howard Bretherton and written by Adele Buffington. This is the fourth film in Monogram Pictures' Rough Riders series, and stars Buck Jones as Marshal Buck Roberts, Tim McCoy as Marshal Tim McCall and Raymond Hatton as Marshal Sandy Hopkins, with Linda Brent, Dennis Moore and Charles King. The film was released on September 26, 1941

Plot
When villains plan to steal the Garcia jewels, the Rough Riders stop the thieves with Buck impersonating an outlaw, Tim a cattle buyer and Sandy as the janitor of the town's saloon.

Production
Though set in Mexico, in order not to offend the United States' Good Neighbor policy, the Production Code Administration ordered changes to the script to not depict any Mexican outlaws or offensively characterise any Mexican nationals.

Cast          
Buck Jones as Marshal Buck Roberts aka Bob 'Bodie' Bronson
Tim McCoy as Marshal Tim McCall
Raymond Hatton as Sandy Hopkins
Linda Brent as Rosita Garcia
Dennis Moore as Joe Collins
Charles King as Steve Slade
Eva Puig as Aunt Maria
Roy Barcroft as Ed Scully
Kermit Maynard as Jeff
Bud Osborne as Hal

See also
The Rough Riders series:
 Arizona Bound
 The Gunman from Bodie
 Forbidden Trails
 Below the Border
 Ghost Town Law
 Down Texas Way
 Riders of the West
 West of the Law

References

External links
 

1942 films
American black-and-white films
American Western (genre) films
1942 Western (genre) films
Monogram Pictures films
Films directed by Howard Bretherton
1940s English-language films
1940s American films